Charles Edward "Ed" Gaunch is a Republican former member of the West Virginia Senate, who represented the 8th district from January 14, 2015 until his defeat by Democrat Richard Lindsay in 2018. From 2019 to 2022 Gaunch served as the West Virginia Secretary of Commerce.

Election results

References

1947 births
Living people
People from Madison, West Virginia
Politicians from Charleston, West Virginia
Republican Party West Virginia state senators
West Virginia State University alumni
Baptists from West Virginia
21st-century American politicians